Lirularia bicostata is a species of sea snail, a marine gastropod mollusk in the family Trochidae, the top snails.

Description
The height of this small species attains 2.4 mm, its diameter 2.3 mm.

Distribution
This marine species occurs in the Pacific Ocean off Baja California, México

References

 J.H. McLean, New Species of Recent and Fossil West American Aspidobranch Gastropods; The Veliger, 1964

External links
 To Encyclopedia of Life
 To USNM Invertebrate Zoology Mollusca Collection
 To ITIS
 To World Register of Marine Species

bicostata
Gastropods described in 1964